is a Japanese mainstream film and adult video (AV) director. Over a career of more than 20 years in adult entertainment, he directed in excess of 200 adult videos.

Life and career

Adult video (AV) director
Morikawa started directing adult videos at least as early as 1989 with  starring Asako Sakura for the Alice Japan studio. In addition to Alice Japan, throughout the decade of the 1990s, Morikawa also directed AVs for several other "Viderin" companies including VIP, Atlas21, h.m.p., Kuki, Media Station and Max-A. During this time, he worked with early AV Idols Rui Sakuragi, Aika Miura, Yuri Komuro and Bunko Kanazawa.

Outside the AV industry, Morikawa was credited as planner for Rokurō Mochizuki's 1991 debut mainstream film Skinless Night.

Morikawa continued working with Alice Japan and Atlas21 in the 2000s but he also began directing for some of the newer independent AV studios such as Moodyz, SOD and by early 2006, S1 where he became one of their leading directors. Morikawa directed videos starring a number of prominent AV actresses including Nao Oikawa, Kokoro Amano, Nana Natsume, Sora Aoi, Sasa Handa, Kaede Matsushima and Akiho Yoshizawa. In 2001, he had a small role playing an AV Director in Masato Ishioka's debut mainstream film Scoutman depicting the adult video industry that both Ishioka and Morikawa worked in.

Mainstream film director
This horror feature was a theatrical sequel to a DVD movie, 2-channel no Noroi Gekijoban, produced in 2011, and continues its theme of a cursed website. The film stars Mariya Suzuki from the Japanese girls singing group AKB48 and was released in Japan by JollyRoger on June 2, 2012.

Morikawa continued his mainstream directing career with the February 2014 horror film , the focus of the horror being hair extensions torn from living women. The film starred another alumni of AKB48, Tomomi Nakatsuka. At the 2015 Yubari International Fantastic Film Festival, Morikawa was awarded the Grand Prize in the Off Theater Competition for his film Makeup Room, detailing the offstage drama in the makeup room at the shooting of an adult video.

References

External links
 
 

Japanese film directors
Japanese pornographic film directors
Living people
Year of birth missing (living people)